The Financial Supervisory Commission (FSC; , abbreviated to ) is an independent government agency subordinate to the Executive Yuan of the Republic of China (Taiwan). It is responsible for regulating securities markets (including the Taiwan Stock Exchange and the Taiwan Futures Exchange), banking, and the insurance sector.

Its main office is located in Banqiao District, New Taipei.

History
It was created on 1 July 2004  to unify several previously separate regulatory authorities which separately supervised different sectors of the finance industry. Prior to the actual creation of the commission, several alternative structures for regulatory agency reform had been proposed, including a purely non-governmental commission, as well as the establishment of both a governmental regulatory agency and non-governmental supervisory commission; the choice of a purely governmental commission was finalized in 2003 by the Legislative Yuan.

The reasons for the creation of the FSC as an umbrella independent financial regulator was due to:
Financial convergence and cross-market business - market has evolved and became more complex to manage
Single financial regulator - one stop shop for regulating all securities and investments.
Independent Authority at Cabinet Level - experts in their field without political interference
Stronger Law Enforcement - cross referencing cases and building stronger case for misconduct

The commission has faced frequent changes in leadership in its short history, due to scandals and crises which began when its first chairperson was removed from his position due to corruption.

Structure

Bureaus
 Banking Bureau
 
 
 Securities and Futures Bureau

Departments
 Department of Planning
 Department of International Affairs
 Department of Legal Affairs
 Department of Information Management
 Other support units

List of chairpersons 

Political Party:

Overseas representative offices
  - London
  - New York City

See also 
 Economy of Taiwan
 List of financial regulatory authorities by country
 Regulatory agency
 Securities Commission
 Statutory authority

Notes

References

External links 

 

2004 establishments in Taiwan
Executive Yuan
Finance in Taiwan
Taiwan
Government agencies established in 2004
Independent government agencies of Taiwan
Regulation in Taiwan
Banking in Taiwan